Sawi or Sawuy is a language of the Sawi people of the Trans–New Guinea phylum spoken in sago swamps in the southwestern parts of the Indonesian province of Papua. Of the neighboring languages, it is most closely related to the Awyu languages to the east.

Sawi is an inflecting language and uses both inflections of the stem and suffixes to indicate person, number, and tense.

References

External links 
 Timothy Usher, New Guinea World, Sawi

Languages of western New Guinea
Greater Awyu languages